Simón Narciso Díaz Márquez (August 8, 1928 – February 19, 2014) was a Venezuelan singer and Grammy Award-winning composer of Venezuelan music.

Career
Díaz endeavored to recover the folklore and musical traditions of the llanos, the Venezuelan plains. This style of music has since been performed by artists such as Argentina's Mercedes Sosa, Brazil's Caetano Veloso, Spain's Joan Manuel Serrat, Peru's Susana Baca, Puerto Rico's Danny Rivera, and Venezuelans Franco De Vita, Soledad Bravo, Juan Carlos Salazar, Carlos Baute and José Luis Rodríguez, among others. Many of Diaz's works have been adapted by symphonies and choral ensembles throughout Venezuela, as well as being incorporated into the orchestral and choral arrangements of conductors and composers of academic music.

Artists from various other disciplines have utilized Díaz's work. For example, German choreographer Pina Bausch included some of Díaz's songs in her work Nur Du. Also, the film director Pedro Almodóvar included Díaz's song "Tonada de Luna Llena" as part of the soundtrack for his film The Flower of My Secret, sung by the Brazilian artist Caetano Veloso.

Díaz has also performed in theater, motion pictures and television. In the 1960s he became a comedian in Venezuela. He had the leading role in three plays, and in films like El Reportero and Isla de sal; has produced and hosted 12 different TV shows, all of them devised to promote Venezuelan music. One of these shows, Contesta por Tío Simón, was devoted to teaching popular culture to children. This children's show was on the air for 10 years, during which time Díaz's viewers began calling him "Uncle Simón". Diaz had a daily radio show for twenty-five years which focused on folklore and Venezuelan music. He has recorded over 70 records and CDs and has made innumerable performances throughout his career. 

Díaz is the musical author of "Caballo viejo", lyric of Angel Eduardo Acevedo, which was recorded by the Gipsy Kings as the hit song "Bamboléo". His compositions have been performed by artists such as Plácido Domingo, Ray Conniff, Julio Iglesias, Celia Cruz, Rubén Blades, Gilberto Santa Rosa, Gipsy Kings, Ivan Lins, Joyce, Cheo Feliciano, Juan Gabriel, María Dolores Pradera, Martirio, Tania Libertad, Ry Cooder and Devendra Banhart

The Latin American TV channel A&E MUNDO produced a documentary dedicated to Díaz under its “Biography” program that honors Diaz's many contributions to Venezuelan culture, the program began airing in September 2004.

After battling Alzheimer's disease for many years, he died on 19 February 2014.

Discography

Awards and recognition
Simón Díaz was awarded the highest recognition conferred by the Venezuelan state, "The Great Ribbon of the Liberator's Order". He was given honorary doctorate degrees by two major Venezuelan universities, Simón Rodríguez University and Zulia's Universidad Católica Cecilio Acosta.

On September 30, 2008, the Latin Grammy Awards announced that it would honor Díaz with a Lifetime Achievement Award, (El Premio del Consejo Directivo).  Diaz was awarded the 2008 Latin Recording Academy Trustees Award, presented by Venezuelan salsa singer Oscar D'León.

References

External links

Simón Díaz Official Website 
 Simón Díaz Biography — TuCuatro
 Simon Diaz Songs, Lyrics and Chords — TuCuatro
 Lets bring Simón Díaz to the 2009 Grammy—Facebook group
 Simón Díaz music
 Palabras para Simón - Lo afirmativo venezolano

1928 births
2014 deaths
Deaths from dementia in Venezuela
Deaths from Alzheimer's disease
People from Aragua
Singers from Caracas
Male composers
Venezuelan composers
Venezuelan folk singers
Venezuelan songwriters
Male songwriters
Venezuelan-cuatro players
Latin music songwriters
20th-century Venezuelan  male singers
21st-century Venezuelan  male  singers